Paul Irwing is a Reader in organisational psychology at the University of Manchester. He is a member of the editorial board of the Journal of Intelligence and a Fellow of the Royal Society of Medicine. Paul Irwing has published research on gender differences in six articles in Intelligence, two articles in the British Journal of Psychology and one article in Nature. He has a total of 70+ publications, including 31 journal articles.

References

External links
University Home Page

Year of birth missing (living people)
Living people
Academics of the University of Manchester
British psychologists
Organizational psychologists
Fellows of the Royal Society of Medicine
Intelligence researchers